1957: Hati Malaya (Malay: 1957: The Heart of Malaya) is a 2007 Malaysian Malay-language historical drama film. It was released on 25 October 2007.

Synopsis
Four young Malaysians, Hali, Salmi, Ani and Rafiq have been assigned to do a picture book of "1957". While two of them grudgingly carry out the request made by the publisher, Hali takes on the role enthusiastically. Along the way, they find themselves immersed in the characters, emotional moments, identifying with and finding meaning in the struggle of "1957". They weave the story of independence by transporting themselves back to the past. Ordinary Malaysians who fell in love, and found their love for the country override their personal emotions. The present characters find new meaning to "Merdeka".

Cast
 Maya Karin as Salmi/Normala
 Sharifah Amani as Ani/Aishah
 Rusdi Ramli as Hali/Zahari
 Adlin Aman Ramlie as Rafik/Rozhan
 Mohd Kamarulzaman Taib as Tunku Abdul Rahman
 Zaefrul Nordin as Dato' Onn Jaafar
 Bront Palarae as Muzafar
 Azhar Sulaiman as Anwar Abdul Malik
 Noor Azhar Murad as Tun Abdul Razak
 Nanu Baharuddin as Sharifah Rodziah
 Jins Shamsuddin as Sultan of Johor
 Iqram Dinzly as Ahmad Badawi
 Ida Nerina as Datin Halimah Hussein
 Liza Othman as Ibu Zain
 Rozie Othman as Putih Mariah Ibrahim Rashid
 Douglas Lim as Ang Lee / Ahli MCA
 Kee Thuan Chye as Tan Cheng Lock
 Chew Kin Wah as Tun H. S. Lee
 Chacko Vadaketh as E. E. C. Thuraisingham
 Megat Shahrizal as Ismail Abdul Rahman
 Azizi Mohd Said as Suleiman Abdul Rahman
 Man Bai as Hussein Onn
 Rahim Razali as Syeikh Abdullah Fahim
 Bell Ngasri as Sardon Jubir
 Mustapha Maarof as Sultan Selangor
 Jalaluddin Hassan as Sultan of Kedah
 Kuswadinata as Sultan of Perak
 Tan Sri Azahari Taib as Tan Sri Azahari Taib
 Zahim Albakri as Sir Edward Osni
 Ridzuan Hashim as Datuk Yahaya
 Adi Putra as Syed Alwi Al-Hadi
 Sani Sudin as 70-year-old Zahari
 Betty Banafe as Friend's Normala
 Jeremy Smeeton as General Sir Gerald Templer
 Kavita Sidhu as Khalilah
 Jit Murad as Tan Sri Dato' Khir Johari

Soundtrack
Track list:
 Hati - Siti Nurhaliza
 Perlu Kamu - Ajai & Krisdayanti

References

External links
 

2007 films
2007 drama films
Malay-language films
English-language Malaysian films
Chinese-language Malaysian films
Malaysian historical drama films
Malaysian political drama films
2000s political drama films
2000s historical drama films
Films directed by Shuhaimi Baba
Pesona Pictures films
Films with screenplays by Shuhaimi Baba
Films produced by Shuhaimi Baba